A sleeve (a word allied to slip, cf. Dutch ) is the part of a garment that covers the arm, or through which the arm passes or slips.

The sleeve is a characteristic of fashion seen in almost every country and time period, across a myriad of styles of dress. Styles vary from close-fitting to the arm, to relatively unfitted and wide sleeves, some with extremely wide cuffs. Long, hanging sleeves have been used variously as a type of pocket, from which the phrase "to have up one's sleeve" (to have something concealed ready to produce) comes. There are many other proverbial and metaphorical expressions associated with the sleeve, such as "to wear one's heart upon one's sleeve", and "to laugh in one's sleeve".

Early Western medieval sleeves were cut straight, and underarm triangle-shaped gussets were used to provide ease of movement. In the 14th century, the rounded sleeve cap was invented, allowing a more fitted sleeve to be inserted, with ease around the sleeve head and a wider cut at the back allowing for wider movement. Throughout the 19th century and particularly during the Victorian era in Western culture, the sleeves on women's dress at times became extremely wide, rounded or otherwise gathered and 'puffy', necessitating the need for sleeve supports worn inside a garment to support the shape of the sleeve. Various early styles of Western sleeve are still found in types of academic dress or other robes, such as ecumenical dress.

Sleeve length varies in modern times from barely over the shoulder (cap sleeve) to floor-length (as seen in the Japanese ). Most contemporary shirt sleeves end somewhere between the mid-upper arm and the wrist.

History

Middle Ages
The medieval sleeve or set-in sleeve was unlike modern techniques. The seam for this type of sleeve was usually placed at the back of the arm, and fit under the arm.

Types of sleeves
Often the names applied to sleeves in historical costume are modern.

See also

Kandys

References

 Oxford English Dictionary
 Picken, Mary Brooks: The Fashion Dictionary, Funk and Wagnalls, 1957.

External links